The 2021–22 Scottish Lowland Football League was the 9th season of the Lowland Football League, part of the fifth tier of the Scottish football pyramid system. Kelty Hearts were the reigning champions but were unable to defend their title after gaining promotion to Scottish League Two.

Bonnyrigg Rose Athletic won their first league title on 1 March 2022 thanks to a 5–0 win over Cumbernauld Colts at New Dundas Park, with five matches still to play. They faced the winners of the 2021–22 Highland Football League (Fraserburgh) in the Pyramid play-off, winning 3–2 on aggregate. Bonnyrigg Rose then defeated Cowdenbeath 4–0 on aggregate in the League Two play-off final to gain promotion to Scottish League Two.

Teams

Celtic and Rangers were approached by the Lowland League for a proposal to admit "B" teams into the league for the 2021–22 season. The proposal was given provisional approval by the majority of member clubs, with the vote being confirmed at the league's AGM on 27 May 2021.

BSC Glasgow changed their name to Broomhill in July 2021.

The following teams changed division after the 2020–21 season.

From Lowland League
Promoted to League Two
Kelty Hearts

To Lowland League
Celtic B
Rangers B

Stadia and locations

Notes

All grounds are equipped with floodlights.

Personnel and kits

Managerial changes

League summary

League table

Positions by round

Results

Lowland League play-off
A three-match round robin play-off took place between the winners of the 2021–22 East of Scotland Football League (Tranent Juniors), the 2021–22 South of Scotland Football League (St Cuthbert Wanderers), and the 2021–22 West of Scotland Football League (Darvel).

References

External links

5
Lowland Football League seasons
SCO